The Springfield Model 1863 was a .58 caliber rifled musket manufactured by the Springfield Armory and independent contractors between 1863 and 1865.

The Model 1863 was only a minor improvement over the Springfield Model 1861. As such, it is sometimes classified as just a variant of the Model 1861. The Model 1861, with all of its variants, was the most commonly used longarm in the American Civil War, with over 700,000 manufactured. The Model 1863 also has the distinction of being the last muzzle-loading longarm produced by the Springfield Armory.

The Model 1863 was produced in two variants. The Type I eliminated the band springs and replaced the flat barrel bands with oval clamping bands. It also featured a new ramrod, a case-hardened lock, a new hammer, and a redesigned bolster (percussion chamber). Several of these modifications were based upon Colt's contract Model 1861, known as the "Colt special". 273,265 Type I variants were manufactured in 1863.

The Type II is sometimes referred to as the Model 1864, but is more commonly referred to as just a variant of the Model 1863. This version re-introduced band springs, replaced the clamping bands with solid oval bands, and replaced the three leaf rear sight with single leaf sight. A total of 255,040 of these were manufactured from 1864 to 1865.

By the end of the Civil War, muzzle-loading rifles and muskets were considered obsolete. In the years following the Civil War, many Model 1863 muskets were converted into breech-loading "Trapdoor Springfields". The breech-loading weapons increased the rate of fire from three to four rounds per minute to eight to ten rounds per minute. The Model 1863 could be converted to breech-loading for about five dollars, at a time when a new rifle would cost about twenty dollars. The conversion of Model 1863 rifles therefore represented a significant cost savings to the U.S. military. The US Military adopted various models like the Springfield Model 1866.

See also
 Springfield rifle
 Springfield musket
 Rifles in the American Civil War

References
 Earl J. Coates and Dean S. Thomas, An Introduction to Civil War Small Arms
 Ian V. Hogg, Weapons of the Civil War

External links

Springfield firearms
Rifled muskets
American Civil War rifles
American Civil War weapons
Weapons of the Confederate States of America